Renegades RFC is a Bermudan rugby club in Hamilton.

History
The club was founded on 4 September 1958, by a group of players who were unhappy with the dominant club in Bermuda at the time, the Bermuda Athletic Association (BAA), which later evolved into Mariners RFC. The reason for the breakaway was a lack of game time for the aforementioned players.

In 1964, the club undertook its first tour, to the United States. This was followed by a tour to Mexico ten years later where they possibly won all their matches, recording four victories in the process. They paid a visit to Jamaica and Bahamas in 1976, before making their second trip to the US in 1977.

Renegades RFC also provided a large of number of players to the Bermuda national rugby union team which was victorious in three consecutive Caribbean Champions tournaments; hosted by Martinique (1977), Guyana (1979) and Trinidad and Tobago (1981) respectively.

Internationally capped players
Paul Dobinson 
Jahan Cedenio
Mike Williams
Peter Dunkerley
Tom Healy
Ian Henderson
Roddy Moore (1990 Martinique)
Gary Wilson
David Petty

References

External links
Renegades RFC

Rugby clubs established in 1958
Bermudian rugby union teams
1958 establishments in Bermuda